The Butcher of Brisbane is a Big Finish Productions audio drama based on the long-running British science fiction television series Doctor Who.
It's the second sequel to the 1977 story The Talons of Weng-Chiang following after The Shadow of Weng-Chiang.

Plot
The Doctor attempts to take Tegan home to Brisbane, Australia, but mistakenly arrives in the 51st century.  The whole world is in chaos and the infamous Minister of Justice, Magnus Greel, is at the height of his power.

Cast
The Doctor – Peter Davison
Tegan Jovanka – Janet Fielding
Nyssa – Sarah Sutton
Vislor Turlough – Mark Strickson
Magnus Greel – Angus Wright
Dr Sa Yy Findecker – Rupert Frazer
Ingrid Bjarnsdottir – Felicity Duncan
Ragan Crezzen – Daniel Weyman
Sasha Dialfa – Daisy Ashford
Eugene Duplessis / Chops – John Banks

Continuity
 Magnus Greel was introduced in the 1977 Fourth Doctor television story, The Talons of Weng-Chiang.  He was a mutated despot from the future who fled to Victorian London in a Time Cabinet, along with his cyborg, Mr Sin.  Under his Supreme Alliance, Greel was said to have killed 100,000, giving him the nickname, The Butcher of Brisbane.
 Time Agents were first mentioned in The Talons of Weng-Chiang, with Greel believing they may be after him.  Beyond that, no other details are known about them.  They weren't mentioned again in a television story until The Empty Child in 2005, when Captain Jack Harkness revealed himself to be a former Time Agent from the 51st century.

Notes
Angus Wright played Mr Dread in The Sarah Jane Adventures story, The Vault of Secrets.

Critical reception
Doctor Who Magazine reviewer Matt Michael noted that the attempt to create a prequel to the well-regarded Talons of Weng-Chiang was "brave", but found the effort successful.

References

External links
The Butcher of Brisbane

2012 audio plays
Fifth Doctor audio plays
Audio plays by Marc Platt
Fiction set in the 6th millennium
Culture of Brisbane